Don't Talk to Irene is a 2017 Canadian comedy film written and directed by Pat Mills. It premiered at the 2017 Toronto International Film Festival.

The film centres on Irene (Michelle McLeod), an overweight and unpopular high school student who wishes to be a cheerleader. After being suspended from school, Irene is sent to a retirement home as punishment. She decides to indulge her passion for cheerleading by enrolling a group of senior citizens for a dance competition. The film's cast also includes Bruce Gray, Anastasia Phillips, Scott Thompson, and Geena Davis.

Cast
Michelle McLeod as Irene
Bruce Gray as Charles
Anastasia Phillips as Lydia
Scott Thompson as Barrett
Geena Davis as herself (voice-over and brief cameo)
Deborah Grover as Ruth
Joan Gregson as Millie
Andy Reid as Tesh
Aviva Mongillo as Sarah
Romeo Carere as Robbie
James Fry as Tony
Kyla Kane as Kelly
Jacob Switzer as Jacques
Alexa Rose Steele as Rachel (credited as Alex Steele)
Darrell Faria as Top Talent Showdown Host
Tracey Hoyt as Principal Firestone

Production and accolades
Mills won the Toronto International Film Festival's annual Pitch This! competition for emerging film directors in 2008 for the film's original pitch, and the film's screenplay won the award for Best Comedy Screenplay at the 2013 Austin Film Festival. However, Mills made Guidance (2015) as his feature film debut before proceeding with Don't Talk to Irene, which entered production in 2016.
It went on to win both the Comedy Vanguard Award and Audience Award at the Austin Film Festival, the Audience Choice at the Kingston Canadian Film Festival and the Galet d'Or at the 5th Canadian film festival of Dieppe, France. In June 2018, Don't Talk to Irene won two Canadian Comedy Awards: Best Feature and Best Writing in a Feature.

Release
Don't Talk to Irene received a limited release at Cineplex Yonge-Dundas in Toronto on September 29, 2017, by Search Engine Films. In the United States, the film was released on March 2, 2018, by Gravitas Ventures.

References

External links

2017 comedy films
2017 independent films
2010s coming-of-age comedy films
2010s dance films
Canadian coming-of-age comedy films
Canadian dance films
Canadian independent films
Cheerleading films
English-language Canadian films
Films shot in Hamilton, Ontario
Films directed by Pat Mills
2010s English-language films
2010s Canadian films